Akçalı is a village in the central district of Hakkâri Province in Turkey. The village is populated by Kurds of the Pinyanişî tribe and had a population of 765 in 2022.

The four hamlets of Eğercik, Kanatlı and Yeniyol are attached to Akçalı.

History 
George Percy Badger noted during his visit to the region in 1850 that the village had a population of Assyrian 90 families, while Edward Lewes Cutts deemed the village to be populated by Kurds in 1877.

Population 
Population history from 2000 to 2022:

References 

Kurdish settlements in Hakkâri Province
Villages in Hakkâri District
Historic Assyrian communities in Turkey